Dubai is the name of a yacht owned by Sheikh Mohammed bin Rashid Al Maktoum, ruler of Dubai, Vice President of the United Arab Emirates.

History 

Dubai was commissioned in 1995 under various project names (Panhandle, Platinum, Golden Star) and was built in cooperation with the German shipyards Blohm+Voss and Lürssen. The yacht was initially built for Prince Jefri Bolkiah of Brunei before 1996, but the client stopped the purchase contract the next year. In 2001, she went to the current owner, Mohammed bin Rashid Al Maktoum. The yacht was designed by Andrew Winch, with interior design by Platinum Yachts, she approximately cost $400 million.

The ship including the floating dock was transported by the  via Turkey to Dubai. The Dubai-based Platinum Yachts FZCO shipyard continued to build the yacht under the former project name Platinum and handed her over to the owner in 2006. The yacht is kept in front of the northern of the two artificial islands, the private island of Mohammed bin Rashid Al Maktoum. From 2006 to 2009, the yacht was the largest yacht in the world with a length of 162 meters, but was replaced by Eclipse and Azzam.

Equipment 
The equipment includes a helipad up to a maximum of 9.5 tons, two 10 m long motor boats, a dining room for 90 guests and a 10 m swimming pool. The yacht also has a disco, a cinema, 20 water bikes, a submarine, a lobster tank and a squash court. Dubai is divided into eight decks and she provides space for up to 88 crew members and 115 guests. 

The four MTU-20V diesel engines can each deliver 6,301 kW and can give the ship a speed of up to 26 knots. With the 1.2 million litre diesel tanks, Dubai is able to travel 8,500 nautical miles.

See also 
List of motor yachts by length
Mohammed bin Rashid Al Maktoum

References

External links 

 Information about the yacht
 Overview, Photos, Specifications and more

Transport in Dubai
Royal and presidential yachts
Ships of the United Arab Emirates
Motor yachts
1998 ships